John Dougherty Defrees (1810–1882) was an American newspaperman and politician.

Political career

Born in Sparta, Tennessee, Defrees moved to Ohio and worked in the law office of Thomas Corwin, who would later serve as Governor of Ohio. In 1831, Defrees and his brother, Joseph, moved to South Bend, Indiana, where they founded the Northwestern Pioneer and St. Joseph Intelligencer, Northern Indiana's first newspaper.

Newspaper career
In 1833, Defrees moved to White Pigeon, Michigan, and began publishing the Michigan Statesman and St. Joseph Chronicle, only the third newspaper published in the Michigan Territory and the first published between Chicago and Detroit. Under Defrees, the paper took a radical Democratic line and supported President Andrew Jackson. Defrees sold his interest in the paper in mid-1834 to Henry Gilbert, who later shortened its title to Michigan Statesman. The paper became the Kalamazoo Gazette in 1837, which, remains in publication.

Defrees returned to South Bend, was admitted to the Indiana bar, and became involved in Indiana state politics, winning election to the Indiana Senate as a Whig. In 1845, he bought the Indiana Journal (now The Indianapolis Star) which he also edited until he sold the paper a decade later, contributing editorials sharply critical of the Polk administration's conduct of the Mexican–American War. When the Whig Party collapsed in the early 1850s, Defrees became an important leader in the fusionist movement that established the Republican Party in Indiana. After divesting himself of the Journal, Defrees sought the Republican nomination for  seat in House of Representatives in 1858, but lost to Albert G. Porter, who later became Governor of Indiana. Defrees subsequently founded the Indianapolis Atlas, which under his leadership promoted Edward Bates for the 1860 Republican presidential nomination, although Bates lost to Abraham Lincoln. Defrees sold the Atlas to the Journal in 1861 after President Lincoln named him superintendent of the newly created U.S. Government Printing Office.

Civil war politics
Defrees was a vocal supporter of the Union and the government during the American Civil War. In those days, the Government Printing Office was a rich source of patronage, and Defrees' failure to satisfy members of Congress in that regard led to his removal in 1869, and the restructuring of the post of Public Printer. Previously, the President named the printer; now and to this day the Senate must approve the appointment.

Defrees backed Horace Greeley for President in 1872 and Rutherford B. Hayes in 1876; after his election, Hayes returned Defrees to the Printing Office, which post he held until April 1, 1882. Defrees retired to Berkeley Springs, West Virginia, where he had made his home since 1861, and died there October 19, 1882. He is buried in Crown Hill Cemetery, Indianapolis.

Defrees was the brother of Joseph H. Defrees, who served in the United States House of Representatives.

Notes

See also
List of United States political families (D)#The Defrees and Frazers

References

External links
 

1810 births
1882 deaths
Burials at Crown Hill Cemetery
People from Sparta, Tennessee
Indiana Whigs
19th-century American politicians
Indiana Republicans
19th-century American newspaper publishers (people)
People from Bath (Berkeley Springs), West Virginia
American male journalists
19th-century American male writers
People from White Pigeon, Michigan
Indiana state senators
19th-century American newspaper founders
19th-century American newspaper editors
Editors of Indiana newspapers
Indiana lawyers
19th-century American lawyers
United States Government Publishing Office